Jim Rugg (born February 1, 1977) is an American cartoonist and illustrator from Pittsburgh known for his tongue-in-cheek evocation of 1970s-era comics and pop culture. His graphic novels and comics collections include Street Angel, Afrodisiac, The P.L.A.I.N. Janes and Janes in Love, One Model Nation, and The Guild.

Rugg has also produced short comics for VH1, New York magazine, True Porn, Meathaus, Cinema Sewer, Strange Tales, the SPX Annual, Project: Superior, Dark Horse Presents, and the Next Issue Project.

Biography 
Rugg's influences include Frank Miller, Erik Larsen, David Lapham, Jack Kirby, David Mazzuchelli, Mike Mignola, the Hernandez brothers, Robert Crumb, Dan Clowes, Chris Ware, and Julie Doucet. Rugg is also inspired by television shows like The Office and Arrested Development, the films of Wes Anderson, Kōbō Abe’s writing, Todd Hido’s photography, and Toba Khedoori's drawings and paintings. He has a BFA in graphic design and painting from a small liberal arts college.

While working as a graphic designer, Rugg met and began working with writer Brian Maruca. The result, Street Angel, was self-published as a mini-comic, where it eventually found its way to the publisher Slave Labor Graphics. The first five issues of Street Angel were collected as a trade paperback by SLG Publishing in 2005.

After the cancellation of a video game project and The P.L.A.I.N. Janes series in 2008, Rugg considered leaving the comics business. His fortunes began turning around in 2009, when he began working on Image Comics' One Model Nation and Dark Horse Comics' The Guild.

In 2010 Rugg (along with co-writer Maruca) released Afrodisiac, collecting stories previously published in anthologies along with new material. (The character first appeared in the pages of Street Angel). The book is a detailed pastiche of 1970s "trash" culture, especially the blaxploitation heroic archetype. The titular hero is an over-the-top '70s-era, kung fu-fighting pimp character depicted in adventures that cross multiple comics styles, from space aliens and flying saucers to dinosaurs to Richard Nixon to Hercules to giant monsters to Dracula. Afrodisiac's production design faithfully evokes the visual style of old comic books, down to faded color schemes and wrinkled, creased covers.

Since 2018, Rugg has co-hosted Cartoonist Kayfabe, a YouTube channel focusing on '90s and independent comics, with fellow Pittsburgh native Ed Piskor, occasionally Tom Scioli, and other acclaimed cartoonists.

He currently teaches in the MFA Visual Narrative program at the School of Visual Arts.

Awards 
Rugg was nominated for a 2010 Ignatz Award for Outstanding Minicomic for Rambo 3.5. In 2011, Afrodisiac was nominated for an Eisner Award in the humor category, and in 2015, Rugg won the Eisner for best publication design for Little Nemo: Dream Another Dream.

He served on the Ignatz Award jury in 2006.

Bibliography 
 Street Angel (SLG Publishing, 2005)  – co-written with Brian Maruca
 The P.L.A.I.N. Janes (DC Comics/Minx, 2007) – written by Cecil Castellucci
 Janes in Love (DC/Minx, 2008) – written by Cecil Castellucci
 Afrodisiac (Adhouse Books, 2010)  – co-written with Brian Maruca
 One Model Nation (Image Comics, 2010) – written by Courtney Taylor
 The Guild (3-issue limited series, Dark Horse Comics, 2010) – written by Felicia Day

References

Sources 

 Manning, Shaun. "Rugg Raps About Afrodisiac," Comic Book Resource (October 27, 2009).

External links 

 

Alternative cartoonists
Artists from Pittsburgh
Living people
1977 births
21st-century American artists
Writers from Pittsburgh
21st-century American male writers
American comics writers
American comics artists
Comics colorists
Comic book letterers